Papyrus 32 (in the Gregory-Aland numbering), designated by , is an early copy of the New Testament in Greek. It is a papyrus manuscript of the Epistle to Titus, it contains only Titus 1:11-15; 2:3-8. On the basis of paleography, the manuscript has been assigned a date around A.D. 200.

Description 

Written in round and rather large letters. A slight tendency towards division of words can be observed. The nomina sacra are abbreviated.

The Greek text of this codex is a representative of the Alexandrian text-type. Aland described it as "at least normal text", he placed it in Category I. This manuscript shows agreement with Codex Sinaiticus and with F G.

It is currently housed with the Rylands Papyri at the John Rylands University Library (Gr. P. 5) in Manchester.

Greek text 
The papyrus is written on both sides. It shows agreement with Codex Sinaiticus, Codex Augiensis, and Codex Boernerianus.

Epistle to Titus 1:11-15 (recto)

Epistle to Titus 2:3-8 (verso)

See also 

 List of New Testament papyri

References

Further reading 

 Arthur Surridge Hunt, Catalogue of the Greek Papyri in the John Rylands Library I, Literatury Texts (Manchester 1911), pp. 10–11.

External links 
  recto Titus 1:11-15
  verso Titus 2:3-8
 Rylands Papyri: Select Rylands Papyri and then Subject: Bible: New Testament etc.

New Testament papyri
2nd-century biblical manuscripts
Early Greek manuscripts of the New Testament
Epistle to Titus papyri